Maintirano is a coastal city, commune urbaine (urban municipality), and Catholic bishopric in western Madagascar approximately 325 kilometres west of the capital Antananarivo. It belongs to the district of Maintirano, which is a part of Melaky Region – and is capital of both.
 
The population of the commune was estimated to be approximately 25,788 in 2018. The city is inhabited mainly by the Sakalava tribe.

Economy and infrastructure 
The climate is fairly hot and access to the region is difficult due to lack of roads and few commercial flights. Maintirano is served by Maintirano Airport and a local maritime harbour.

The town has a permanent court and hospital.

The majority 55% of the population works in fishing. 34% are farmers. Main local products include shrimp and beef. The most important crop is bananas, while other important products are maize, sweet potatoes and rice. Industry and services provide employment for 0.8% and 10.2% of the population, respectively.

Roads
The hardly practicable Nationale Road 1a connects the city with Tsiroanomandidy and inlands.
The Nationale Road 8a leads southwards to Antsalova.
The Nationale Road 19 northwards to Mahajunga.

Religion
 FJKM - Fiangonan'i Jesoa Kristy eto Madagasikara (Church of Jesus Christ in Madagascar)
 Roman Catholic Diocese of Maintirano.

Climate

References 

Cities in Madagascar
Populated places in Melaky
Regional capitals in Madagascar